ReliXIV is the 13th full-length studio album by American thrash metal band Overkill, released in spring 2005. The reason the Roman numeral 14 is included in the title is because the band includes the Overkill EP in their lineup of studio albums, which would make this album the 14th by their chronology. It can also be because Overkill released the covers album Coverkill, which would have been their eleventh studio album. While this diction left it unclear how the title was to be pronounced, Blitz just mentioned it as "Relics" when announcing songs from the album on stage. The album produced the popular "Old School", which has been played at every Overkill show since it was first released. As of late 2007, ReliXIV sold over 16,000 copies in the U.S.

Track listing

Credits
Bobby "Blitz" Ellsworth – lead vocals
D.D. Verni – bass, backing vocals
Dave Linsk – lead guitar
Derek Tailer – rhythm guitar
Tim Mallare – drums

Additional personnel
 Produced by Overkill
 Presented by Eddie Trunk on "Old School"
 Mixed by John D'Uva and Overkill
 Engineered by D.D. Verni, Dave Linsk, and Dave Manheimer
 Mastered by Roger Lian at Masterdisk, New York City, USA

References

External links
 Official OVERKILL Site

Overkill (band) albums
2005 albums
Spitfire Records albums
Albums with cover art by Travis Smith (artist)